Rancho Viejo may refer to:

Dominican Republic 
 Rancho Viejo, Puerto Plata, Dominican Republic
 Rancho Viejo, La Vega, Dominican Republic

United States 
 Rancho Mission Viejo, California, often called Rancho Viejo by locals
 Rancho Viejo, Texas
 Rancho Viejo, Starr County, Texas